Pablo Ángel Ariel Lucero (born 16 April 1999) is an Argentine professional footballer who plays as a midfielder for Almirante Brown, on loan from All Boys.

Career
All Boys gave Lucero his beginning in senior football. Pablo De Muner chose him off the substitutes bench in Primera B Nacional matches against Comunicaciones, Acassuso and Barracas Central from November 2018 in 2018–19. Lucero's first start came during a 1–1 draw at home to San Miguel on 25 January 2019. In January 2022, Lucero joined Almirante Brown on a one-year loan deal.

Career statistics
.

References

External links

1999 births
Living people
Footballers from Buenos Aires
Argentine footballers
Association football midfielders
Primera B Metropolitana players
All Boys footballers
Club Almirante Brown footballers